The 1998 Minnesota Golden Gophers football team represented the University of Minnesota in the 1998 NCAA Division I-A football season. In their second year under head coach Glen Mason, the Golden Gophers compiled a 5–6 record and were outscored by their opponents by a combined total of 249 to 229.

Tyrone Carter was named an All-American by Football News and The Sports Network.  Carter was also named All-Big Ten first team.  Running back Thomas Hamner was named All-Big Ten second team.  Defensive tackle Matt Anderle, linebacker Luke Braaten, cornerback Jason Hagman, linebacker Justin Hall, fullback Brad Prigge, long snapper Derek Rackley, offensive guard Ryan Roth, tight end Zach Vevea, linebacker Jim Wilkinson and linebacker Parc Williams were named Academic All-Big Ten.

Total attendance for the season was 249,764, which averaged out to 41,627 per game.  The season high for attendance was against rival Iowa.

Schedule

Roster
DB Tyrone Carter, Jr.

References

Minnesota
Minnesota Golden Gophers football seasons
Minnesota Golden Gophers football